Acacia obesa is a shrub of the genus Acacia and the subgenus Plurinerves that is native to a small area of south western Australia.

Description
The low spreading shrub typically grows to a height of  It has cylindrical and tapering branchlets that can be quite hairy. Like most species of Acacia it has phyllodes rather than true leaves. The cylindrical evergreen phyllodes are slightly to strongly incurved but can occasionally be quite straight. It blooms from July to September and produces yellow flowers.

Taxonomy
The species was first formally described by the botanists Richard Sumner Cowan and Bruce Maslin in 1995 as a part of the work Acacia Miscellany 15. Five groups of microneurous species of Acacia (Leguminosae: Mimosoideae: section Plurinerves), mostly from Western Australia as published in the journal Nuytsia. It was reclassified by Leslie Pedley in 2003 as Racosperma obesum then transferred back to genus Acacia in 2014.

Distribution
It is native to an area in the southern Wheatbelt region of Western Australia where it is found growing in sandy or gravelly loam soils. The shrub has a limited distribution and is confined to an area between Lake Grace, Lake King and Hyden where it is usually a part of open scrub, open heathland or low open woodland communities.

See also
 List of Acacia species

References

obesa
Acacias of Western Australia
Taxa named by Bruce Maslin
Plants described in 1995
Taxa named by Richard Sumner Cowan